Copelands Landing railway station is located at Copeland's Landing in Unorganized Kenora District in northwestern Ontario, Canada. The station is on the Canadian National Railway transcontinental main line, between White to the west and Malachi to the east, and is used by Via Rail as a stop for transcontinental Canadian trains.

References

External links
 Copelands Landing railway station

Via Rail stations in Ontario
Railway stations in Kenora District